Vladimir Aleksandrovich Poluyakhtov (born 11 July 1989) is a Russian professional football player. He plays as a midfielder for Orenburg. For most of his career, he played as a right back or left back.

Career statistics

Club

Notes

References

External links
 

1989 births
People from Veliky Ustyug
Sportspeople from Vologda Oblast
Living people
Russian footballers
Association football defenders
Association football midfielders
FC Moscow players
FC Saturn Ramenskoye players
FC Dynamo Saint Petersburg players
FC Zhemchuzhina Sochi players
FC Orenburg players
FC Anzhi Makhachkala players
PFC Krylia Sovetov Samara players
Russian Second League players
Russian First League players
Russian Premier League players